The Atka B-24D Liberator is a derelict bomber on Atka Island in the Aleutian Islands of Alaska. The Consolidated B-24D Liberator was deliberately crash-landed on the island on 9 December 1942, and is one of only eight surviving D-model Liberators (including partial and derelict aircraft). The aircraft, serial no. 40-2367, was built in 1941, and was serving on weather reconnaissance duty when it was prevented from landing at any nearby airfields due to poor weather conditions. The only casualty of the crash landing was Brigadier General William E. Lynd, who suffered a fractured collarbone.

The wreck site was listed on the National Register of Historic Places in 1979, and was designated as part of the World War II Valor in the Pacific National Monument in 2008, redesignated Aleutian Islands World War II National Monument in 2019.

See also
List of surviving Consolidated B-24 Liberators
National Register of Historic Places listings in Aleutians West Census Area, Alaska

References

Aircraft on the National Register of Historic Places
Transportation on the National Register of Historic Places in Alaska
Four-engined tractor aircraft
High-wing aircraft
National Park Service National Monuments in Alaska
National Register of Historic Places in Aleutians West Census Area, Alaska
1930s United States bomber aircraft
World War II on the National Register of Historic Places in Alaska
World War II Valor in the Pacific National Monument
Individual aircraft of World War II
Four-engined piston aircraft